Newfoundland and Labrador has been mentioned and written about more fully by many writers.

Newfoundland

Literature

Alligator by Lisa Moore
The Boat Who Wouldn't Float by Farley Mowat
The Colony of Unrequited Dreams by Wayne Johnston
Flying over Hate by Ryan Chafe
Galore by Michael Crummey
Hannah: The Lighthouse Girl of Newfoundland by Don Ladolcetta
House of Hate by Percy Janes
The Mayor of Casterbridge by Thomas Hardy. There is mention of a character being lost off the coast of Newfoundland.
The Navigator of New York by Wayne Johnston; its chief protagonist, Devlin Stead, was raised in Newfoundland by his aunt and uncle.
Random Passage by Bernice Morgan
Rare Birds by Edward Riche
River Thieves by Michael Crummey
The Shipping News (1993) by Annie Proulx: The story centers on Quoyle, a newspaper pressroom worker from upstate New York, who returns to his ancestral home in Newfoundland.
This All Happened by Michael Winter
We, the Drowned (2006) by Carsten Jensen's (1952–) includes a voyage, in the 1920s, by a Danish sailing schooner, from Iceland to the Dominion of Newfoundland to collect salt fish for Portugal from an outport.
The Wreckage by Michael Crummey

In Other Languages
Een landingspoging op Newfoundland (English: An attempt to land in Newfoundland), a book of short stories by Willem Frederik Hermans, in Dutch
, a Catalan legend about a voyage to Newfoundland.

Film
The Adventure of Faustus Bidgood
Bayo
Black Conflux
Crown and Anchor
The Divine Ryans
Down to the Dirt
Extraordinary Visitor
The Grand Seduction
Hunting Pignut
John and the Missus
Rare Birds
Riverhead
The Rowdyman
Secret Nation
The Shipping News

Radio
Tales from Pigeon Inlet as told by Uncle Mose, played by Ted Russell and set in the fictional outport of Pigeon Inlet was a very popular and comedic radio broadcast in Newfoundland which later spurred a TV show.
The Great Eastern was a comedy series on CBC Radio, presented in the format of a radio news magazine series produced by the Broadcasting Corporation of Newfoundland.

Theatre
Come from Away

Television
CODCO
Dooley Gardens
Gullage's
Hatching, Matching and Dispatching
Little Dog
Rabbittown
Republic of Doyle
Total Drama World Tour

Labrador

Literature
The Chrysalids (U.S. title: Re-Birth) by John Wyndham, 1955
Labrador by Kathryn Davis 1988 (Farrar, Straus, Giroux). Reprint 2019 (Graywolf Press). Despite the title most of the action takes place in the USA.
The Land God Gave Cain by Hammond Innes.
Williwaw by Phyllis S. Moore (1978). A novel about the struggle of Labrador for independence.

References